Helen Faison (1924–2015) was an American educator. She had a long career with the Pittsburgh Public Schools, rising from teacher to the superintendent of Pittsburgh Public Schools. She was the first African American and the first woman to become superintendent of the schools.

Career
Faison began her career as a teacher at Fifth Avenue High School in 1950. Later, she would become a counselor at Westinghouse High School, where she had graduated in 1942. In 1968 she became the first African American and first woman principal at Fifth Avenue High School.

Educational degrees
Faison earned her undergraduate (bachelor's in education, 1946) and graduate degrees (master's in education, 1955; doctorate in educational administration, 1975) at the University of Pittsburgh.

About her
Dr. Helen Faison (1924-2015) was an educational trailblazer in the Pittsburgh area for more than half a century. While receiving her undergraduate and graduate degrees at the University of Pittsburgh, she prepared for more than 43 years of exceptional service in the Pittsburgh Public School District.

Dr. Faison was one of the first African American teachers in the district and was both the first female and African American to hold the position of high school principal and deputy superintendent. During her service in the district, Dr. Faison positively impacted the lives of countless students and helped shape the careers of numerous educators. The District recognized her contributions by naming two schools in her honor, the Helen S. Faison Arts Academy and the Faison Intermediate School.

Dr. Faison also served as the director of the Pittsburgh Teachers' Institute, and received recognition from various community organizations including the Council of Great Schools, the Pittsburgh NAACP, the League of Women Voters, the Western Pennsylvania Historical Society and Carlow College.

She was awarded the first fully endowed chair of the University of Pittsburgh's School of Education and worked selflessly as a member of the Board of Trustees of the Fund for Advancement of Minorities through Education since the organization's inception.

References

1924 births
2015 deaths
Date of birth missing
Place of birth missing
Date of death missing
Place of death missing
20th-century American educators
University of Pittsburgh alumni
Educators from Pennsylvania
20th-century American women educators
20th-century African-American women
20th-century African-American educators
21st-century African-American people
21st-century African-American women
Women heads of universities and colleges